Cataingan, officially the Municipality of Cataingan,  is a 2nd class municipality in the province of Masbate, Philippines. According to the 2020 census, it has a population of 50,623 people.

History 
In 1948, Placer, then a barrio of this town, was separated as a town by virtue of Republic Act No. 292, passed June 16, 1948. Three years later, in 1951, the barrios of Limbuhan, Guindawahan, Palho, Casabangan, Salvacion, Alegria, Tanke, Bundukan, Bugtong, and Cabangrayan were separated from Cataingan and created into the town of Limbuhan. Placer,  at that time of its creation, included the entire present day Municipality of Esperanza (which was then known as Barrio Esperanza).

Geography

Barangays
Cataingan is politically subdivided into 36 barangays.

Climate

Demographics

Cataingan is one of the municipalities and cities of Masbate where Masbateño is the indigenous language. Waray is also spoken there.

Economy

Notable people 
 Bea Santiago – Miss International 2013

References

External links 
 [ Philippine Standard Geographic Code]
 Philippine Census Information
 Local Governance Performance Management System
 elgu2.ncc.gov.ph

Municipalities of Masbate